"We Share the Same Sun" is a song by rock band Stereophonics. It is the opening track on their 2013 album Graffiti on the Train and was released as the album's fourth single on 12 August 2013. The song was released as a 10" vinyl format and Stereophonics have regularly played it as part of their set list. When Graffiti on the Train was released the song had a mixed to positive response and has been compared to "Landslide" by Fleetwood Mac.

Composition
"We Share the Same Sun" is played at a tempo of 128 beats per minute. The song runs for 3:44 on both the album and single. It begins with an acoustic guitar playing E♭-D-Gm-F for fifteen seconds until lead singer Kelly Jones begins his vocals. When the chorus enters, electric guitars are abruptly introduced, along with bass and drums provided by Richard Jones and Javier Weyler, respectively. The second and last chorus is extended which includes Adam Zindani singing to harmonise with Jones. The bridge section has Zindani echoing Jones' vocals, this is then followed by a guitar solo from Zindani.

The guitar in the song was described as "bluesy" by Matthew Horton from the BBC.

Promotion and release
"We Share the Same Sun" was regularly played on BBC Radio 2, particularly on The Chris Evans Breakfast Show, two weeks before its release. Jones performed a solo version and this was included on the bonus disc of Graffiti on the Train as "We Share the Same Sun (up close)". On the iTunes deluxe edition, a video of Stereophonics in the studio - titled "We Share the Same Sun (In the Studio)" - was included which features shots of the studio, Stereophonics performing and fellow producer Jim Lowe at a mixing console. This was filmed when former drummer Javier Weyler was still in the band.

Formats
Promotional CDs were made available on 1 July 2013 which featured the song as well as the instrumental version. The limited 10" vinyl edition was available to pre-order on the band's website and was released on 12 August 2013 with lyrics etched on Side B.<ref name="pre order">{{cite web |url=http://shop.stereophonics.com/home/we-share-the-same-sun-limited-edition-10-pre-order.html |title=We Share The Same Sun limited edition 10 Pre-order |publisher=Stereophonics Ltd |access-date=24 July 2013}}</ref> The cover art for the single was created by Steve Goddard who created the artwork for Graffiti on the Train.

Release history

Music video

The music video for "We Share the Same Sun" was directed by Jones. It features the band in a low-lit room performing while an image projector displays various multicoloured patterns on them and the wall behind them. Note: The thumbnail shows the multicoloured patterns the image projector displays on the band and wall behind them. There are also shots of the projector behind individual band members as they play, creating lens flares. Although Jamie Morrison is seen playing the drums in the video it was Javier Weyler who provided the drums on the track.

Live performances
In March 2013, Stereophonics held a March Tour to support Graffiti on the Train and "We Share the Same Sun" was played at all the shows. Note: Stereophonics or 2013 has to be clicked on manually. The band were booked for several summer festivals in 2013, including Pinkpop Festival (16 June), T in the Park (14 July) and the V Festival (18 August), where they performed the song. When performing at Radio 2 In Concert, the song was the first of 6 songs to be played from the album.

Critical response
Initial reviews of "We Share the Same Sun" have been mixed to positive. When reviewing Graffiti on the Train'', Drowned in Sound contributor Sean Adams gave the song a positive review, calling it one of the stand-out tracks on the record. He compared the beginning of the track to "Landslide" by Fleetwood Mac. Eric Allen from American Songwriter called the song "moody" but stated, "it becomes glaringly obvious the band has regrouped and rediscovered their passion for making records."

Matthew Horton at the BBC had a less enthusiastic response, describing it as "turning a bluesy guitar over and over against sinister keys – no quick rewards here." At NME, Tom Howard had a negative response writing, "By slowly fading into the background of pop culture, the Stereophonics have created some space to pump out the same old stuff for their fans. So on ‘We Share The Same Sun’ Kelly Jones is gruff and there’s a big chorus, and the faithful will lap it up like hairy dogs with bowls of ice-cold water in hot weather."

Appearances in other media
The song has been used by Sky Sports F1 in the background of their coverage of race weekends. A clip of the song was played on Channel 4's Sunday Brunch programme.

Track listings

Personnel

Stereophonics
 Kelly Jones – lead vocals, guitar
 Richard Jones – bass guitar
 Adam Zindani – guitar, backing vocals
 Javier Weyler – drums

Additional
 Jim Lowe – keyboards, programming

Technical
 Production, Mixing – Kelly Jones, Jime Lowe
 Engineering – Lowe
 Mastering – Dick Beetham

Charts

References
Notes

Footnotes

Videography

External links
"We Share the Same Sun at Stereophonics.com

2013 singles
Stereophonics songs
Songs written by Kelly Jones
2013 songs